Hanns Blaschke (1 April 1896, in Vienna – 25 October 1971, in Salzburg) was an Austrian politician. A member of the Nazi Party (NSDAP), he served as mayor of Vienna from 30 December 1943 until 6 April 1945.

Biography
Blaschke was born in Vienna in 1896. The son of a tax officer, he studied electrical engineering at the Vienna University of Technology. His studies were interrupted in 1914 by the outbreak of World War One. Blaschke fought as a lieutenant in the Austro-Hungarian Army until the end of the war. He resumed his studies and graduated in 1922.

As early as 1931 Blaschke was working as an illegal functionary in the Austrian NSDAP.

In 1938 Blaschke participated in the annexation of Austria, taking part in the assault on the building of the Fatherland Front. Afterwards he was a prominent member of the Nazi government, becoming mayor of Vienna in 1943. He held this position until the Nazis surrendered in April 1945.

In 1948 Blaschke was convicted of high treason in Austria. He was sentenced to six years imprisonment and deprivation of property; however this judgement was overturned on appeal in 1958.

References

1896 births
1971 deaths
Austrian politicians
Austrian prisoners sentenced to life imprisonment
Nazi Party politicians
Politicians from Vienna
Members of the Reichstag of Nazi Germany

People convicted of treason against Austria
Prisoners sentenced to life imprisonment by Austria
Nazis convicted of crimes